Fascism in Asia refers to political ideologies in Asia that adhered to fascist policies, which gained popularity in many countries in Asia during the 1920s.

East Asia

China

Kuomintang
The Kuomintang, a Chinese nationalist political party, had a history of fascism under Chiang Kai-shek's leadership. The Blue Shirts Society, a fascist paramilitary organization within the KMT that modeled itself after Mussolini's blackshirts, was anti-foreign and anti-communist, and it stated that its agenda was to expel foreign (Japanese and Western) imperialists from China, crush Communism, and eliminate feudalism. In addition to being anticommunist, some KMT members, like Chiang Kai-shek's right-hand man Dai Li were anti-American, and wanted to expel American influence. Close Sino-German ties also promoted cooperation between the Nationalist Government and Nazi Germany until diplomatic ties were cut off in 1941 due to the declaration of war by China against fascist countries, including Germany, Japan, and Italy.

The New Life Movement was a government-led civic movement in 1930s China initiated by Chiang Kai-shek to promote cultural reform and Neo-Confucian social morality and to ultimately unite China under a centralised ideology following the emergence of ideological challenges to the status quo. The Movement attempted to counter threats of Western and Japanese imperialism through a resurrection of traditional Chinese morality, which it held to be superior to modern Western values. As such the Movement was based upon Confucianism, mixed with Christianity, nationalism and authoritarianism that have some similarities to fascism. It rejected individualism and liberalism, while also opposing socialism and communism. Some historians regard this movement as imitating Nazism and being a neo-nationalistic movement used to elevate Chiang's control of everyday lives. Frederic Wakeman suggested that the New Life Movement was "Confucian fascism".

Kai-tsu p'ai faction of the Kuomintang
Wang Jingwei, a right-wing nationalist and anti-communist member of the Kuomintang (Nationalist Party of China), and in particular the left-wing nationalist Kai-tsu p'ai (Reorganization) faction, was originally hostile towards fascism in Europe, but it gradually drifted to be in favour of fascism, especially towards the economic policies of Nazism in the late 1930s. Wang Jingwei visited Germany in 1936, and changed his views on fascism, speaking positively about European fascist states, saying, "Several advanced countries have already expanded their national vitality and augmented their people's strength, and are no longer afraid of foreign aggression." Publicist T'iang Leang-Li of the People's Tribune newspaper associated with the Kai-tsu p'ai promoted the good nature of fascism in Europe while attempting to distance Kai-tsu p'ai from the overtly negative aspects of fascism and wrote in 1937: "Whatever we may think about fascist and Nazi methods and policies, we must recognize the fact that their leaders have secured the enthusiastic support of their respective nations." T'iang Leang-Li claimed that the "foolish, unwise, and even cruel things" done in the fascist states had been done in a positive manner to bring about "tremendous change in the political outlook of the German and Italian people". T'iang Leang-Li wrote articles that positively assessed the "socialist" character of Nazism. Similarly, Shih Shao-pei of the Kai-tsu p'ai rebuked Chinese critics of Nazism by saying "We in China [...] have heard too much about the 'national' and other flagwaving activities of the Nazis, and not enough about the 'socialist' work they are doing." Shih Shao-pei wrote about reports of improved working conditions in German factories, the vacations given to employees by Kraft durch Freude, improved employer-employee relations, and the provision of public service work camps for the unemployed. Other works made by the People's Tribune spoke positively about Nazism, saying that it was bringing the "integration of the working classes ... into the National Socialist state and the abolition of ... the evil elements of modern capitalism".

Japan

Taisei Yokusankai 
The  was created by Prime Minister Fumimaro Konoe on 12 October 1940 and it evolved into a "militaristic" political party, which aimed to remove sectionalism from the politics and economics of the Empire of Japan in order to create a totalitarian one-party state, which would maximize the efficiency of Japan’s total-war effort during World War II.

Tohokai
Tohokai was a Japanese Nazi party formed by Seigo Nakano.

National Socialist Workers' Party
The National Socialist Japanese Workers' Party is a small neo-nazi party which is classified as an uyoku dantai (a category of small Japanese ultranationalist far-right groups).

Korean Peninsula

North Korea

Brian Reynolds Myers judged that North Korea's dominant ideology was not communism, but nationalism derived from Japanese fascism. Some scholars point out that North Korea's Juche ideology has a far-right and fascist element, but it is controversial whether Juche ideology is really a far-right ideology.

South Korea

Lee Bum-seok, a Korean independence activist and South Korean national-conservative politician, was negative about Nazi Germany and the Japanese Empire, but positively evaluated their strong patriotism and fascism based on ethnic nationalism. Along with South Korea's right-wing nationalist Ahn Ho-sang, he embodied One-People Principle, a major ideology of the Syngman Rhee regime.

Some South Korean liberal-left media  have defined Park Chung-hee administration as an anti-American, Pan-Asian fascist and Chinilpa regime influenced by Ikki Kita's "Pure Socialism".

South Asia

India
Indian independence activist Subhas Chandra Bose insisted on the union of Nazism and communism. He was also a supporter of Shōwa Statism.

Hindutva is the predominant form of Hindu Nationalism in India and was mainstreamed into Politics of India with Narendra Modi's election as Prime Minister in 2014.
 As a political ideology, the term Hindutva was articulated by Vinayak Damodar Savarkar in 1923. It is championed by the Hindu Nationalist volunteer organisation Rashtriya Swayamsevak Sangh (RSS), the Vishva Hindu Parishad (VHP), the Bharatiya Janata Party (BJP) and other organisations, collectively called the Sangh Parivar. The Hindutva movement has been described as a variant of "right-wing extremism" and as "almost fascist in the classical sense", adhering to a concept of homogenised majority and cultural hegemony. Some analysts dispute the "fascist" label, and suggest Hindutva is an extreme form of "conservatism" or "ethnic absolutism". Hindutva organizations are mainly for nationalism and peace. They also want Akhand Bharat, or greater India, which includes India's historical boundaries of India, Pakistan, Bangladesh, Nepal, Tibet, Bhutan, Myanmar and Sri Lanka. Some people also include Indonesia, Afghanistan, Thailand, Malaysia and more.

Pakistan

Pakistan's Tehreek-e-Labbaik Pakistan is considered fascist by some analysts because of its engagement in Islamic extremism and militant terrorism.

West Asia

Iran

Fascism in Iran was adhered to by the SUMKA (Hezb-e Sosialist-e Melli-ye Kargaran-e Iran or the Iran National-Socialist Workers Group), a neo-Nazi party founded by Davud Monshizadeh in 1952. SUMKA copied not only the ideology of the Nazi Party but also that group's style, adopting the swastika, the black shirt and the Hitler salute while Monshizadeh even sought to cultivate an appearance similar to that of Adolf Hitler. The group became associated with opposition to Mohammad Mosaddegh and the Tudeh Party while supporting the Shah over Mossadegh.

Iraq
The Al-Muthanna Club was a pan-arabist fascist political society established in Baghdad in 1935.

Israel

Revisionist Maximalism
The Revisionist Maximalist short-term movement formed by Abba Achimeir in 1930 was the ideology of the right-wing fascist faction Brit HaBirionim within the Zionist Revisionist Movement (ZRM). Achimeir was a self-described fascist who wrote a series of articles in 1928 titled "From the Diary of a Fascist". Achimeir rejected humanism, liberalism, and socialism; condemned liberal Zionists for only working for middle-class Jews; and stated the need for an integralist, "pure nationalism" similar to that in Fascist Italy under Benito Mussolini. Achimeir refused to be part of reformist Zionist coalitions and insisted that he would only support revolutionary Zionists who were willing to utilize violence. Anti-Jewish violence in 1929 in the British Mandate of Palestine resulted in a rise in support for Revisionist Maximalists and lead Achimeir to decry British rule, claiming that the English people were declining while the Jewish people were ready to flourish, saying:

In 1930, Achimeir and the Revisionist-Maximalists became the largest faction within the ZRM and they called for closer relations with Fascist Italy and the Italian people, based on Achimeir's claim that Italians were deemed the least anti-Semitic people in the world.

In 1932, the Revisionist Maximalists pressed the ZRM to adopt their policies, titled the "Ten Commandments of Maximalism", made "in the spirit of complete fascism". Moderate ZRM members refused to accept this and moderate ZRM member Yaacov Kahan pressured the Revisionist Maximalists to accept the democratic nature of the ZRM and not push for the party to adopt fascist dictatorial policies.

In spite of the Revisionist Maximalists' opposition to the anti-Semitism of the Nazi Party, Achimeir was initially controversially supportive of the Nazi Party in early 1933, believing that the Nazis' rise to power was positive because it recognized that previous attempts by Germany to assimilate Jews had finally been proven to be failures. In March 1933, Achimeir wrote about the Nazi party, stating, "The anti-Semitic wrapping should be discarded but not its anti-Marxist core...." Achimeir personally believed that the Nazis' anti-Semitism was just a nationalist ploy that did not have substance.

After Achimeir supported the Nazis, other Zionists within the ZRM quickly condemned Achimeir and the Revisionist Maximalists for their support of Hitler. Achimeir, in response to the outrage, in May 1933 reversed their position and opposed Nazi Germany and began to burn down German consolates and tear down Germany's flag. However, in 1933, Revisionist Maximalist' support quickly deteriorated and fell apart, they would not be reorganized until 1938, after Achimeir was replaced by a new leader.

Lebanon
Within Lebanon two pre-war groups emerged that took their inspiration from the fascist groups active in Europe at the time. In 1936 the Kataeb Party was founded by Pierre Gemayel and this group also took its inspiration from the European fascists, also using the Nazi salute and a brown shirted uniform. This group also espoused a strong sense of Lebanese nationalism and a leadership cult but it did not support totalitarianism and as a result it could not be characterised as fully fascist. Both groups are still active although neither of them demonstrates the characteristics of fascism now.

Syria

The Syrian Social Nationalist Party was founded in 1932 by Antun Saadeh with the aim of restoring independence to Syria from France and taking its lead from Nazism and fascism. This group also used the Nazi salute and a symbol similar to the swastika while Saadeh borrowed elements of Nazi ideology, notably the cult of personality and the yearning for a mythical, racially pure golden age. A youth group, based on the Hitler Youth template, was also organised.

In 1952, the Syrian dictator and military officer Adib Shishakli founded the Arab Liberation Movement, based on the ideas' of "Greater Syria" (similar to the SSNP, Shishakli's former party) and Arab nationalism, but also with fascist-type elements. After the 1963 Syrian coup d'état the party was banned.

See also
Fascism in Africa
Fascism in Europe
Fascism in North America
Fascism in South America
Relations between Nazi Germany and the Arab world

References

Works cited
 
 

 
Politics of Asia